American composer, pianist and painter Ann Wyeth McCoy  (March 15, 1915 - November 10, 2005) was the youngest daughter of artist-illustrator N.C. Wyeth and the fourth of his five children. She was born in Chadds Ford, Pennsylvania. Ann had a life-long interest in antique porcelain dolls, which began in 1923 when she received her first doll as a gift from her parents on her eighth birthday. Each subsequent birthday and Christmas during her childhood, she received another doll. From 1972 to 2004 her doll collection was exhibited at the Brandywine River Museum in Chadds Ford during the Christmas holidays.

Life and career
McCoy studied piano with William Hatton Greene, composition with Harl McDonald at the University of Pennsylvania, and painting with her father. In 1934 her composition Christmas Fantasy was performed by the Philadelphia Orchestra, with Leopold Stokowski conducting. In 1935, she married John W. McCoy II, a young artist whom she had met when he studied with her father at the Chadds Ford studio. They had three children, John Denys, Anna Brelsford, and Maude Robin. McCoy did not begin painting seriously until her children grew up. The first formal exhibition of her work, mainly watercolors, was in the late 1960s. The Brandywine River Museum has an Ann Wyeth McCoy collection, which contains correspondence, photographs, musical compositions, sound recordings, and her early drawings. The collection also details her interest in antique porcelain dolls.

McCoy composed many songs for special people or occasions, such as a tribute to a White House dinner honoring her brother Andrew Wyeth; lullabies for the children of friends and family; and songs aboutMcCoy of art such as her brother's paintings or a sculpture by Degas. She also set poetry to music for piano.

Works 
Her musical compositions include:

Orchestra 

Christmas Fantasy
In Memoriam (dedicated to her father N.C. Wyeth)
Maine Summer

Piano 
Anna Kuerner
Black Angus
Brook in Winter
Cannibal Shore
Chambered Nautilus
Children's Pieces
Christmas
Christmas Tree
Embers
Fog
For Joel Wyeth Nields
For John McCoy
George VI: Death of a King
(The) German
Glen Mere Church, Maine
Grandfather's Sleigh
Helga Suite: Chorale
In Memoriam: to NCW
In Memory of Robin's Dog "Charlie"
Irish Dance
Lament for Christina Olson and Her World
Maine Preludes
March of the Knights
Mort de Nureyev
Mushrooms by Jamie
Music Box for Betsy Wyeth
Music for Jamie
Newell
Patriot - March for Ralph Cline
Portrait of My Father N.C. Wyeth
Prelude: After the Swans
Reverie: In Memoriam Robert F. Kennedy
Sarabande
Soliloquy
Song Sirens
To a Wax Ballerina by Degas
To John's Picture of Sandpipers
To Robin McCoy and Her Horse Kilo
Tone Poem on the Helga Paintings
Triumphant Entrance and Lullaby for John Wyeth McCoy

Vocal 

Christmas Salutation from Chadd's Ford (text by N. C. Wyeth; music by Ann Wyeth McCoy)
Songs

See also 

Piano Music of Ann Wyeth McCoy by Dr. Donna Mulzet Beech, 2017
 Piano Music of Ann Wyeth McCoy, Book Two: Of Paintings and a Sculpture by Dr. Donna Mulzet Beech, 2020
The Natural Thing to Do: the Music of Ann Wyeth McCoy, a documentary by Denys McCoy narrated by Richard Chamberlain

References 

American women composers
20th-century women composers
American artists
1915 births
2005 deaths
20th-century American women artists
20th-century American people
21st-century American women